Homebase is a British home improvement store and garden centre.

Home base or Homebase may also refer to:
HomeBase, former US home improvement store
Homebase (album), a 1991 album by DJ Jazzy Jeff and the Fresh Prince
Homebase (novel), a novel by Shawn Wong
Home Base, an alternate name for Area 51, a military base located in Nevada, U.S.
An alternate name for home plate in baseball